Seetha is a 1967 Indian Tamil-language drama film written and directed by A. P. Nagarajan. The film stars Gemini and Savitri Ganesh, the former's 100th film as an actor. It was released on 23 June 1967.

Plot

Cast 
 Gemini Ganesh
 Savitri Ganesh as Seetha
 Muthuraman
 Nagesh
 K. R. Vijaya as Vedha
 K. Sarangapani
 Manorama

Production 
Seetha was directed by A. P. Nagarajan under the banner Rajalaxmi Pictures. He also wrote its screenplay. Ganga was the art director, Rajan and T. Natarajan were the editors. The film was Gemini Ganesan's (credited as Gemini Ganesh) 100th as an actor.

Soundtrack 
Music was by K. V. Mahadevan and lyrics were written by Kannadasan.

Release and reception 
Seetha was released on 23 June 1967, and distributed by Crescent Movies. Kalki appreciated the story for lacking confusion, and the cast performances.

References

Bibliography

External links 
 

1960s Tamil-language films
1967 drama films
1967 films
Films directed by A. P. Nagarajan
Films scored by K. V. Mahadevan
Films with screenplays by A. P. Nagarajan
Indian drama films